This article displays the qualifying draw for the women's singles event at the 2013 Australian Open.

Seeds

Qualifiers

Qualifying draw

First qualifier

Second qualifier

Third qualifier

Fourth qualifier

Fifth qualifier

Sixth qualifier

Seventh qualifier

Eighth qualifier

Ninth qualifier

Tenth qualifier

Eleventh qualifier

Twelfth qualifier

External links 
 Qualifying draw
 2013 Australian Open – Women's draws and results at the International Tennis Federation

Women's Singles Qualifying
Australian Open (tennis) by year – Qualifying